Obrębiec  is a village in the administrative district of Gmina Czernice Borowe, within Przasnysz County, Masovian Voivodeship, in east-central Poland.

External links
 Jewish Community in Obrębiec on Virtual Shtetl

References

Villages in Przasnysz County